Sunset Beach is a small unincorporated community located between the cities of Seaside and Warrenton in Clatsop County, Oregon, United States. Sunset Beach is located between U.S. Route 101, Neacoxie Lake and the Pacific Ocean.  It serves as the northernmost access to the resort community of Surf Pines, and provides motor vehicle beach access. The "Fort to Sea Trail", which follows the route used by the Lewis and Clark Expedition when hiking from Fort Clatsop to the Pacific Ocean, ends at the beach access. A beach of the same name is west of the community.

See also
Sunset Beach State Recreation Site
Lewis and Clark National Historical Park

References

External links
 (the beach west of the community)

Oregon Coast
Beaches of Oregon
Unincorporated communities in Clatsop County, Oregon
Unincorporated communities in Oregon
Landforms of Clatsop County, Oregon